Pingasa pseudoterpnaria is a moth of the family Geometridae first described by Achille Guenée in 1858. It is found in China (Hubei, Hunan, Anhui, Shandong, Zhejiang, Fujian, Beijing, Jiangxi, Jiangsu, Sichuan), Japan and India.

The wingspan is 32–35 mm.

Subspecies
Pingasa pseudoterpnaria pseudoterpnaria (Japan, China)
Pingasa pseudoterpnaria gracilis Prout, 1916 (India)
Pingasa pseudoterpnaria tephrosiaria (Guenée, [1858]) (India)

References

Moths described in 1858
Pseudoterpnini
Moths of Japan